The men's C-1 500 metres event was an open-style, individual canoeing event conducted as part of the Canoeing at the 1980 Summer Olympics program.

Medallists

Results

Heats
Twelve competitors were entered, but one withdrew. Held on July 30, the top three finishers in each heat moved on to the final with the others were relegated to the semifinal.

Semifinal
A semifinal was held on August 1 with the top three finishers advancing to the final.

Final
The final took place on August 1.

References
1980 Summer Olympics official report Volume 3. p. 191. 
Sports-reference.com 1980 C-1 500 m results.

Men's C-1 500
Men's events at the 1980 Summer Olympics